Ann Codee (born Anna Marie Vannuefflin, 5 March 1890 – 18 May 1961) was a Belgian actress with numerous hit films on her résumé, such as Can-Can, Kiss Me Kate, and Interrupted Melody. Born in Antwerp, Belgium, her name was sometimes found in newspapers as Anna Cody.

Biography
Codee was born in Antwerp. She married actor Frank Orth around 1911. She and her husband toured American vaudeville in the 1910s and 1920s as the comedy act "Codee and Orth". The team made its film debut in 1929, appearing in a series of multilingual movie shorts. Thereafter, both Codee and Orth flourished as Hollywood character actors. Codee was seen in dozens of films as florists, music teachers, landladies, governesses and grandmothers. She played a variety of ethnic types, from the very French Mme. Poullard in Jezebel (1938) to the Gallic Tante Berthe in The Mummy's Curse (1941).

Codee's last film appearance was as a tight-corseted committeewoman in Can-Can (1960). Her career highlights include her part in the Natalie Wood film Kings Go Forth (1948) and the Oscar-nominated Ann Miller film Kiss Me Kate (1953). She also had an uncredited role as the biologist Dr. Dupree in the 1953 film The War of the Worlds.

She died of a heart attack in Los Angeles, California on May 18, 1961. She is buried in Forest Lawn Cemetery in the Hollywood Hills next to her husband.

Partial filmography

 42nd Street (1928, Short)
 Meet The Wife (1929, Short) as The Wife
 Stranded in Paris (1929, Short)
 A Bird in the Hand (1929, Short)
 Music Hath Charms (1929, Short) as Violin Teacher
 Meine Frau (1930, Short) as The Wife
 Frank Orthe and Anne Codee in "Imagine my Embarrassment" (1930, Short) as The Sleeping Wife
 Taking Ways (1930, Short) as The Wife
 The Bitter Half (1931, Short) as Ann, the Wife
 Sleepy Head (1931)
 Dumb Luck (1931)
 Under the Pampas Moon (1935) as Madame LaMarr
 Hi, Gaucho! (1935) as Doña Vincenta del Campo
 Brilliant Marriage (1936) as Yvette Duval
 Thin Ice (1937) as Interviewer (uncredited)
 Fit for a King (1937) as Telephone Operator (uncredited)
 Expensive Husbands (1937) as Maria
 Jezebel (1938) as Mme. Poullard (uncredited)
 The Roaring Twenties (1939) as Saleswoman (uncredited)
 Charlie Chan in City in Darkness (1939) as Complainant at Police (uncredited)
 I Was an Adventuress (1940) as Frenchwoman at Party (uncredited)
 Captain Caution (1940) as Landlady
 Drums of the Desert (1940) as Mme. Fouchet
 Arise, My Love (1940) as Mme. Bresson
 Come Live With Me (1941) as Yvonne
 Charlie Chan in Rio (1941) as Margo
 Woman of the Year (1942) as Madame Sylvia (uncredited)
 Dr. Renault's Secret (1942) as Passerby at Marcel's Shop (uncredited)
 Army Surgeon (1942) as Flower Woman (uncredited)
 Reunion in France (1942) as Rosalie (uncredited)
 Old Acquaintance (1943) as Tress, Greer Garson's Maid (uncredited)
 Tonight We Raid Calais (1943) as Mme. Grandet
 Paris After Dark (1943) as Mme. Benoit (uncredited)
 Shine On, Harvest Moon (1944) as Wardrobe Woman (uncredited)
 Show Business (1944) as French Modiste (uncredited)
 Mr. Skeffington (1944) as French Modiste (scenes deleted)
 Bathing Beauty (1944) as Mme. Zarka
 Marriage Is a Private Affair (1944) as Madame Cushine (uncredited)
 The Mummy's Curse (1944) as Tante Berthe (uncredited)
 Tonight and Every Night (1945) as Annette (uncredited)
 Hangover Square (1945) as Yvette, Netta's Maid (uncredited)
 The Clock (1945) as Lady on Bus (uncredited)
 Secret Agent X-9 (1945, Serial) as 'Mama Pierre' Dupray
 Her Highness and the Bellboy (1945) as Countess Tradiska (uncredited)
 Kitty (1945) as Madame Aurelie (uncredited)
 Johnny Angel (1945) as Charwoman (uncredited)
 This Love of Ours (1945) as Anna
 Holiday in Mexico (1946) as Margaret, Evans' Housekeeper (uncredited)
 It's Great to Be Young (1946) as Mrs. Johnson
 So Dark the Night (1946) as Mama Michaud
 Till the Clouds Roll By (1946) as Mme. Larouche (uncredited)
 The Other Love (1947) as The Florist (uncredited)
 Lured (1947) as Matilda (uncredited)
 The Unfinished Dance (1947) as Mme. Borodin
 Rose of Santa Rosa (1947) as Aunt Isabel
 Tycoon (1947) as When Willie Comes Marching Home
 That Midnight Kiss (1949) as Mme. Bouget
 When Willie Comes Marching Home (1950) as French Resistance Fighter (uncredited)
 The Secret Fury (1950) as Tessa (uncredited)
 Under My Skin (1950) as Henriette (uncredited)
 A Lady Without Passport (1950) as Maria, Marianne's Landlady (uncredited)
 Al Jennings of Oklahoma (1951) as Mme. Le Cler (uncredited)
 Mr. Imperium (1951) as Anna Pelan
 Go for Broke! (1951) as Pianist (uncredited)
 On the Riviera (1951) as Mme. Madeleine Periton (uncredited)
 Rich, Young and Pretty (1951) as Mme. Milan (uncredited)
 An American in Paris (1951) as Therese (uncredited)
 Detective Story (1951) as French Woman (uncredited)
 The Lady Pays Off (1951) as Marie
 What Price Glory (1952) as Nun (uncredited)
 The Iron Mistress (1952) as Landlady (uncredited)
 The Clown (1953) as Ballet Instructor (uncredited)
 The War of the Worlds (1953) as Dr. Dupree (uncredited)
 Dangerous When Wet (1953) as Mrs. Lanet
 Kiss Me Kate (1953) as Suzanne
 The Last Time I Saw Paris (1954) as Nurse #2 (uncredited)
 So This Is Paris (1954) as Grand'mere Marie
 Interrupted Melody (1955) as Madame Gilly
 Daddy Long Legs (1955) as Madame Sevanne (uncredited)
 The Sun Also Rises (1957) as Mme. Blanche, Concierge (uncredited)
 The Young Lions (1958) as French Woman (uncredited)
 Kings Go Forth (1958) as Mme. Brieux
 The Man Who Understood Women (1959) as French Maid (uncredited)
 Can-Can (1960) as League president

References

External links

Ann Codee at Moviefone
Ann Codee at Hollywood.com

1890 births
1961 deaths
American film actresses
Vaudeville performers
Belgian film actresses
20th-century American actresses
Belgian emigrants to the United States